Resettlement may refer to:

 Population transfer, movement of a large group of people from one region to another
 Refugee resettlement, a voluntary UN Refugee Agency program
 Resettlement Administration, a New Deal federal agency
 Resettlement Department, a department of the Hong Kong government
 Resettlement (Newfoundland), an approach to centralize the population into growth areas
 Resettlement to the East, a Nazi euphemism used to refer to the deportation of Jews to extermination camps
 Indian removal, a United States government policy of forced displacement of Native Americans tribes from their ancestral homelands